Tyson Gamble (born 21 June 1996) is an Australian professional rugby league footballer who plays as  and  for the Newcastle Knights in the National Rugby League.

He previously played for the Wests Tigers and Brisbane Broncos in the NRL.

Background
Gamble was born in Brisbane, Queensland, Australia. Gamble played his junior football at Albany Creek and moved to the Redcliffe Dolphins at age 16.

Playing career

Early years
In 2016, when Gamble played in the Redcliffe Dolphins’ Brisbane Rugby League team, he won the Don McLennan Trophy for best player in the grand final. Gamble progressed through to the grades to play for the Redcliffe Dolphins senior side in the Queensland Cup. In May 2017, he signed a 2-year contract with the Wests Tigers starting in 2018.

2018
Gamble started the season playing for the Wests Tigers Intrust Super Premiership NSW team, Western Suburbs. He played a part in the Magpies’ early successes that year – scoring a try in Round 1, and playing a leading role in his team's consecutive wins early in the year. 

In round 15 of the 2018 NRL season, he made his NRL debut for the Wests Tigers against the Canberra Raiders, but it was his only appearance for the season.

2019
On 6 May, Gamble was selected for the Canterbury Cup NSW residents side to play against the Queensland residents representative team.

On 25 June, it was announced that Gamble had been released from the Wests Tigers, effective immediate, to return to Queensland.

On 29 June, Gamble was a late inclusion for his former junior club, the Redcliffe Dolphins, in their Round 15 clash against the previously undefeated Sunshine Coast Falcons. Redcliffe won the match with Gamble kicking five conversions.

2020
In round 19, Gamble made his first start for Brisbane after appearing before off the bench. In the first sixty seconds of the game, Gamble was knocked unconscious after attempting to tackle Parramatta player Maika Sivo.  He played no further part in the match which ended in a 26-12 defeat.

2021
In round 8, Gamble was called into the Brisbane side for their match against the Gold Coast. Brisbane won the game 36-28 after being down 22-0. It was Gamble's first win in the NRL. Commentator Billy Slater said, "He's the one organising play, he's the one talking and pointing. He is getting to the points and getting these plays on. He was outstanding in this game, he just gave so much structure and gave Milford that freedom."

In round 10 against Manly-Warringah, Gamble was sent to the sin bin during the club's 50-6 loss.

On 16 August, Gamble was suspended by the NRL for two matches after being placed on report for using a crusher tackle during Brisbane's 21-20 loss against the Sydney Roosters.

2022
In September, Gamble signed a 2-year contract with the Newcastle Knights starting in 2023.

References

External links

Newcastle Knights profile
Brisbane Broncos profile
Wests Tigers profile

1996 births
Australian rugby league players
Wests Tigers players
Redcliffe Dolphins players
Western Suburbs Magpies NSW Cup players
Rugby league five-eighths
Rugby league halfbacks
Rugby league players from Brisbane
Living people
Brisbane Broncos players
Newcastle Knights players